Karol: A Man Who Became Pope is a 2005 TV miniseries written and directed by Giacomo Battiato, and created as a Polish-Italian-French-German and Canadian joint cooperation project. Karol is a biography of Karol Wojtyła, later known as Pope John Paul II, beginning in 1939 when Karol was only 19 years old and ending at the 1978 papal election that made him Pope.

The TV miniseries was initially to air in early April 2005 in the Vatican, but it was delayed due to the Pope's death. It was broadcast for the first time by the Italian television station Canale 5 on the first day of the 2005 papal election. Although it was originally broadcast on television, it was also released in theaters, which allowed the film to be shown in Poland.

The incredible success of the movie prompted the creation of a sequel, Karol: The Pope, The Man (2006), which portrayed Karol's life as Pope from his papal inauguration to his death.

Main cast
 Piotr Adamczyk - Karol Józef Wojtyła
 Małgosia Bela - Halina Kwiatkowska "Hania"
 Raoul Bova - Priest Tomasz Zaleski
 Matt Craven - Hans Frank
 Ken Duken - Adam Zieliński
 Ennio Fantastichini - Nowak
 Olgierd Łukaszewicz - Karol Wojtyła (senior)
 Lech Mackiewicz - Stefan Wyszyński
 Radosław Pazura - Paweł
 Violante Placido - Maria Pomorska
 Grażyna Szapołowska - Brigitte Frank
 Kenneth Welsh - Professor Wójcik
 Patrycja Soliman - Wisława

Notes
At Lublin University, a student gives his name as Martin Mickiewicz, and Father Karol responds, "That's quite a name to live up to." This is a reference to Polish national poet, Adam Mickiewicz.
People did not talk and/or clap in church until the late 1970s and early 1980s due to a canon law that still exists, forbidding actions that are "contrary to the sacred nature" of the Church. (Canon 1210)

Soundtrack
By Ennio Morricone released in 2007 on 2 CDs.

External links

2005 television films
2005 films
2000s English-language films
2000s Italian-language films
Latin-language films
Polish-language films
Films about Catholicism
Italian World War II films
Cold War films
Films set in Poland
Films set in Kraków
Films set in Vatican City
Films shot in Poland
Films shot in Kraków
Canadian biographical drama films
2005 biographical drama films
Films about Pope John Paul II
German biographical drama films
Italian biographical drama films
Polish biographical drama films
Films directed by Giacomo Battiato
Italian multilingual films
Polish multilingual films
2005 multilingual films
2000s Canadian films
Canadian World War II films
Polish World War II films
German World War II films
French World War II films
2000s German films